State Route 239 (SR 239) is a primary state highway in the U.S. state of Virginia. Known as Victory Boulevard, the state highway runs  between intersections with SR 337 in the independent city of Portsmouth. SR 239 connects U.S. Route 58 (US 58) and Interstate 264 (I-264) in the western part of Portsmouth with US 17 in the southern part of the city.

Route description

SR 239 begins at an intersection with SR 337 (Portsmouth Boulevard) in the western part of Portsmouth. The state highway heads south as a four-lane divided highway and intersects US 58 and US 460 Alternate, which follow Airline Boulevard. Immediately south of Airline Boulevard, SR 239 has a grade crossing of a Norfolk Southern Railway rail line. The state highway continues south through a diamond interchange with I-264. SR 239 passes to the west of the Portsmouth campus of Tidewater Community College and Bide-A-Wee Golf Course as it curves to the east. The state highway intersects US 17 (George Washington Highway), then briefly parallels Norfolk Southern's Norfolk District rail line, which forms the boundary between the independent cities of Portsmouth and Chesapeake. SR 239 veers north and crosses Paradise Creek to enter the Norfolk Naval Shipyard, where the highway reaches its eastern terminus at SR 337 (Elm Avenue) west of the Jordan Bridge. The roadway continues north as Williams Avenue through the heart of the U.S. Navy shipyard.

Major intersections

References

External links

Virginia Highways Project: VA 239

239
State Route 239